Matthias Lindner (born September 7, 1988 in Scheiblingkirchen-Thernberg, Austria) is a footballer forward, who plays for FC Blau-Weiß Linz.

Club career
Before joining Mattersburg Lindner played for Admira Wacker, where he came through the youth ranks.

External links
Player profile - SV Mattersburg
Soccerterminal.com - Linder Matthias

1988 births
Living people
People from Neunkirchen District, Austria
Austrian footballers
FC Admira Wacker Mödling players
SV Mattersburg players
Austrian Football Bundesliga players
Association football forwards
Footballers from Lower Austria